Tracys Landing is an unincorporated community in Anne Arundel County, Maryland, United States.  Tracy's Landing Tobacco House No. 2 was listed on the National Register of Historic Places in 1982.  The St. James Church was listed on the National Register of Historic Places in 1972.

Geography
Tracys Landing is adjacent to the waterfront town of Deale.

References

Unincorporated communities in Anne Arundel County, Maryland
Unincorporated communities in Maryland